Piibe is a village in Väike-Maarja Parish, Lääne-Viru County, in northeastern Estonia.

Well-known biologist and explorer, the founder of embryology Karl Ernst von Baer (1792–1876) was born in Piibe Manor and owned the complex from 1834 to 1866.

References

 

Villages in Lääne-Viru County
Kreis Jerwen